Cryptandra hispidula, commonly known as rough cryptandra, is a species of flowering plant in the family Rhamnaceae and is endemic to South Australia. It is a small shrub with clustered, cylindrical leaves, and tube-shaped white flowers surrounded by leafy bracts.

Description 
Flowering occurs in most months.

Taxonomy
Cryptandra hispidula was first formally described in 1858 by Siegfried Reissek and Ferdinand von Mueller in the journal Linnaea from specimens collected by Charles Stuart. The specific epithet (hispidula) means "somewhat rough".

Distribution and habitat
Rough cryptandra mainly grows in swampy country on Kangaroo Island and the southern Mount Lofty Ranges of South Australia.

References

hispidula
Rosales of Australia
Flora of South Australia
Plants described in 1858
Taxa named by Ferdinand von Mueller